Legal Week was a weekly British magazine for business lawyers, launched in 1999 by Mark Wyatt and Mary Heaney.

History
It was acquired by Incisive Media in 2005. 

In 2016, the company sold the magazine to ALM. It is now a fully digital publication operating under the Law.com International brand. The magazine was a recipient of the PPA Business Magazine of the Year award.

References

External links 
 Legal Week web site

1999 establishments in the United Kingdom
ALM (company)
Business magazines published in the United Kingdom
Weekly magazines published in the United Kingdom
Law of the United Kingdom
Legal magazines
Magazines established in 1999
Professional and trade magazines